Plagiogyria assurgens is a species of fern in the family Plagiogyriaceae. It is endemic (unique) to China.

References

Endemic flora of China
Cyatheales
Endangered plants
Taxonomy articles created by Polbot